Mimesis is a quarterly literary magazine based in Norwich that deals predominantly with poetry. The magazine was started in 2007.  Issues appear in January, April, July and November. The journal stands out for the number of pages filled purely by poems. An interview with a well-known poet is also featured in each issue. A small number of greyscale artworks appear alongside the writing.

References

External links
Mimesis Poetry web site

Literary magazines published in the United Kingdom
Quarterly magazines published in the United Kingdom
Cultural magazines published in the United Kingdom
Magazines established in 2007
Mass media in Norwich
Poetry magazines published in the United Kingdom